USS Surprise may refer to the following ships operated by the United States:

  was a sloop of the Continental Navy purchased in 1777.
 USS Surprise was a brig built in 1814 and renamed  later that year
  was a ketch purchased in 1815 that served until 1820
  was a patrol gunboat purchased from the British Royal Navy in 1942 and decommissioned in 1945
  was a patrol gunboat commissioned in 1969, decommissioned in 1973, and loaned to the Turkish Navy in 1973, where she served as Bora until 2000
 

United States Navy ship names